The Rope is the debut album by the darkwave band Black Tape for a Blue Girl. It was released on vinyl in 1986 by Projekt Records. Later cassette and CD versions were released.

Track listing
 "Memory, Uncaring Friend" – (Sam Rosenthal, Allan Kraut) - 3:40
 Oscar Herrera - vocals
 Sam Rosenthal - electronics
 Allan Kraut - guitar, bass, drums
 "Hide in Yourself" – (Sam Rosenthal, Allan Kraut) - 3:58
 Kim Prior - vocals
 Oscar Herrera - vocals
 Sam Rosenthal - electronics, drum programming
 Allan Kraut - guitar, bass, drum machine
 "Within These Walls" – (Sam Rosenthal) - 3:47
 Kim Prior - vocals
 Oscar Herrera - vocals
 Adam Buhler - guitar
 Sam Rosenthal - electronics
 Allan Kraut - bass
 "The Holy Terrors" – (Sam Rosenthal) - 2:03
 Kim Prior - vocals
 Oscar Herrera - vocals
 Sam Rosenthal - electronics
 Allan Kraut - drums
 "End" – (Sam Rosenthal) - 2:22
 Kim Prior - vocals
 Oscar Herrera - vocals
 Candy Sherlock - violin
 Sam Rosenthal - electronics
 "Seven Days Till Sunrise" – (Sam Rosenthal) - 2:16
 Richard Watson - clarinet
 Cauleen Smith - cello
 Greg Wilson - guitar
 "The Rope" – (Sam Rosenthal) - 3:12
 Kim Prior - vocals
 Oscar Herrera - vocals
 Richard Watson - clarinet
 Candy Sherlock - violin
 Sam Rosenthal - electronics
 "The Few Remaining Threads" – (Sam Rosenthal) - 3:24
 Candy Sherlock - violin
 Sam Rosenthal - electronics
 Allan Kraut - drums
 "The Lingering Flicker" – (Sam Rosenthal) - 5:54
 Lara Radford - violin
 Sam Rosenthal - electronics
 "Slow Blur" – (Sam Rosenthal) - 5:09
 Lara Radford - violin
 Sam Rosenthal - electronics
 "The Floor Was Hard but Home" – (Sam Rosenthal) - 3:34
 Kim Prior - vocals
 Greg Wilson - guitar
 Sam Rosenthal - electronics
 "We Return" – (Sam Rosenthal) - 4:13
 Kim Prior - vocals
 Oscar Herrera - vocals
 Sean Whitehead - vocals
 Candy Sherlock - violin
 Sam Rosenthal - electronics
 Robin Russell - voice

Sources

Black Tape for a Blue Girl albums
Projekt Records albums
1986 debut albums